Otto Kohn (16 July 1907 – 9 May 1992) was a German long-distance runner. He competed in the men's 5000 metres at the 1928 Summer Olympics.

References

1907 births
1992 deaths
Athletes (track and field) at the 1928 Summer Olympics
German male long-distance runners
Olympic athletes of Germany
Place of birth missing
20th-century German people